Richard Durham (September 6, 1917 – April 27, 1984) was a writer and radio producer in the United States. He was African-American.

Early life
He was born in Raymond, Hinds County, Mississippi and moved with his family to Chicago in 1921. He attended Hyde Park High School and Northwestern University.

Career
In 1940, with support from the Illinois Writer's Project (part of the Federal Writers' Project), Durham wrote two short radio dramas entitled The Story of Winslow Homer and The Story of Auguste Rodin. An essay, "The philosophical basis of Sterling McMurrin", was also published.

Durham wrote for New Masses, the Chicago Defender, the Chicago Star and the Illinois Standard newspapers. At the same time he joined the Communist Party, USA.

His first radio series was DemocracyUSA, which aired in 1946 on Chicago's WBBM. The next year he started dramatic Black soap opera radio series, Here Comes Tomorrow.

Destination Freedom
Following his early radio writings, Durham wrote and produced the radio drama Destination Freedom. In cooperation with The Chicago Defender, he began this series over NBC Chicago outlet WMAQ in July 1948, with scripts emphasizing the progress of African-Americans from the days of slavery to the ongoing struggle for racial justice.

Post-Destination Freedom
After Destination Freedom Durham was the national program director of the United Packinghouse Workers of America. He resigned in 1958.

Muhammed Speaks editing
In the 1960's Durham was the editor of Muhammad Speaks, a Nation of Islam newspaper in Chicago.

Bird of the Iron Feather soap opera
While an editor of Muhammed Speaks Durham started up a soap opera on Chicago's NPR radio/WBEZ-FM television station. Bird of an Iron Feather had an all Black cast and ran for 21 episodes three times a week starting in January 1970. Newton Minow was the chairman of the Channel 11 WTTW TV station that put on the show via a grant from the Ford Foundation. The show's title came from a speech by Frederick Douglass given in 1847.

Other media
He had a supporting role in the 1972 film Sounder.
He also co-wrote The Greatest: My Own Story, the 1975 autobiography of Muhammad Ali. The book was adapted into a 1977 movie of the same name. In 1980 Ali and Durham wrote the article "Why I Must Fight" for Umoja Sasa.

Durham also wrote for the Illinois Writers Project, Here Comes Tomorrow (WJJD/Chicago) and Ebony Magazine. His own short book of poetry, Night Windowpanes, was published in 1975.

Political activity
During Harold Washington's 1982 mayoral election Durham worked to improve Washington's political speaches.

Personal life
He was married Clarice Davis Durham (1919–2018), a prominent Chicago educator. Durham himself died on April 27, 1984, of a heart attack while on a trip to New York City.

See also
 Carlton Moss – a 1930–40's Black radio dramatist
 Roi Ottley – journalist and writer who wrote the radio series New World A'Coming, broadcast by WMCA in New York City in 1944

References

Books cited, with reviews
 Williams, Sonja D. (2015). Word Warrior: Richard Durham, Radio, and Freedom University of Illinois Press,

Further reading
 
 
 
 
 
 
 
 
 
 Richard Durham Papers 1939–1999, 
 Richard Durham's Destination Freedom : scripts from radio's Black legacy, 1948–50 (with J. Fred MacDonald),

External links
 
 Destination Freedom programs
 Destination Freedom Black Radio Days, from KGNU News – Boulder Community Broadcast Association
 
 "History, Memory, and the Power of Black Radio", by Ashleigh Lawrence-Sanders, March 16, 2018 – African American Intellectual History Society (AAIHS)
 Mapping the Stacks – Guide to the Richard Durham Papers, 1939–1999 – Chicago Public Library
 Richard Durham – Radio Hall of Fame
 Richard Durham Papers  – Chicago Public Library archives
 Richard Durham – KeyWiki
 Richard Durham Destination Freedom – Goodreads
 Word Warrior: Richard Durham, Radio & Freedom – video presentation from the Library of Congress featuring author Sonja D. Williams
 ‘Word Warrior’ Traces Uncommon Life of Chicago Writer Richard Durham, Nick Blumberg,  October 12, 2017, WTTW

1917 births
1917 in radio
1984 deaths
20th-century African-American writers
20th-century American screenwriters
Activists for African-American civil rights
African-American historians
African-American journalists
African-American male writers
African-American male actors
African-American men in politics
African-American radio
African-American television writers
American male television writers
American documentary radio programs
Historians of African Americans
Historians of the civil rights movement
Members of the Communist Party USA
Northwestern University alumni
People from Chicago
People from Raymond, Mississippi
People who wrote slave narratives
Writers from Chicago